Carludovica is a genus in the family Cyclanthaceae.  It is native to tropical America, from southern Mexico and Guatemala to Ecuador and Bolivia. Carludovica is named in honor of Charles IV of Spain and his wife Maria Luisa of Parma.

Cultivation and uses

The genus is probably best known for Carludovica palmata (toquilla), the young leaves of which are made into Panama hats.

An unidentified species belonging to this family (possibly a Carludovica species) has been marketed as a houseplant in the United States under the name "Jungle Drum".

Lists of species 
According to Kew World Checklist of Selected Plant Families, there are four species
 Carludovica drudei Mast. - Chiapas, Oaxaca, Tabasco, Costa Rica, Guatemala, Panama, Colombia, Ecuador, Venezuela 
 Carludovica palmata Ruiz & Pav. - widespread from Tabasco to Bolivia
 Carludovica rotundifolia Schaedtler - Costa Rica, Guatemala, Honduras, Panama
 Carludovica sulcata Hammel - Nicaragua, Costa Rica

Tropicos lists more species but it may contain potential synonyms:
 -  -  -  -  -  -  -  -  -  -  -  -  -  -  -  -  -  -  -  -  - C. divergens (syn. of Asplundia divergens) -  -  -  -  -  -  -  -  -  - C. gigantea (syn. of C. palmata) -  -  -  -  -  -  -  -  -  -  - C. incisa (syn. of C. palmata) -  -  -  -  -  -  -  -  -  -  -  -  -  -  -  -  -  -  -  -  -  -  -  -  -  -  -  -  -  -  -  -  -  -  -  -  -  -  -  -  -  -  -  -  -  -  -  -  -  -  -  -  -  -  -  -  -  -  -  -  -  -  -  -  -

References

 Franz, Nico M.; O'Brien, Charles W. (2001) "Ganglionus, a New Genus of Derelomini (Coleoptera: Curculionidae) Associated with Carludovica (Cyclanthaceae)" Annals of the Entomological Society of America 94 (6): 835–850.

External links

Cyclanthaceae
Pandanales genera